Kristian Aasvold (born 30 May 1995) is a Norwegian racing cyclist, who currently rides for UCI ProTeam . He competed in the men's team time trial event at the 2017 UCI Road World Championships.

Major results
2018
 3rd Road race, National Road Championships
 5th Sundvolden GP
 5th Himmerland Rundt
 5th Fyen Rundt
 10th Ringerike GP
2019
 2nd Lillehammer GP
2021
 3rd Road race, National Road Championships
 5th Overall Arctic Race of Norway
 6th Overall Tour of Norway
 10th Gooikse Pijl

References

External links
 

1995 births
Living people
Norwegian male cyclists
People from Snåsa